Raymond Reisser (10 December 1930 – 4 April 2017) was a French professional racing cyclist. He rode in two editions of the Tour de France. He died on 4 April 2017.

References

External links
 

1930 births
2017 deaths
French male cyclists
Cyclists from Lyon